Robert Orchard is a New Zealand former professional rugby league footballer who played in the 1960s and 1970s.

Playing career
Orchard originally played for Ngongotaha and represented Bay of Plenty.

In 1967 Orchard moved to the Ellerslie club in the Auckland Rugby League competition and became an Auckland representative. In 1968, Auckland defeated Canterbury 29-15 during Queen's Birthday weekend.

He played for the New Zealand Māori side in 1972.

In 1973 Orchard moved to Queensland and represented the state, playing two games against New South Wales. While in Queensland, Orchard spent time with Redcliffe, Mt Isa, Mackay and Wynnum-Manly.

International honours
Orchard first represented New Zealand while at Bay of Plenty in 1965 against Great Britain and France (3-matches). He again played for the Kiwis in 1966 against Great Britain and, while at Auckland, in 1967 against Australia (2-matches), in 1970 against Great Britain (3-matches), in 1971 against Australia, Great Britain (3-matches), and France (3-matches), and in 1972 against Australia.

Genealogical information
Orchard is the brother of the fellow New Zealand international Phillip, two other brothers, Eddie and John, both also played for Ngongotaha.

References

Auckland rugby league team players
Bay of Plenty rugby league team players
Ellerslie Eagles players
New Zealand national rugby league team players
New Zealand rugby league players
Ngongotaha Chiefs players
Place of birth missing (living people)
Queensland rugby league team players
Rugby league props
Rugby league second-rows
Year of birth missing (living people)
New Zealand Māori rugby league players
New Zealand Māori rugby league team players
Redcliffe Dolphins players
Mackay Cutters players
Wynnum Manly Seagulls players
Living people
People from Ngongotaha